Katie Burrows (née Galloway) is an American college basketball coach. From 2018 to 2022, she was head coach at Chattanooga.

Playing career

Katie started her basketball career at  Lookout Valley High School in Tiftonia Tennessee. She received many accolades during her high school career.  She was awarded Best of Preps Female Athlete of the Year by the Chattanooga Times Free Press. She was elected 4x first team by Chattanooga Times Free Press, a 3x Regional Player of the Year. She was also elected to the all state team. In back-to-back seasons, she was a finalist for Tennessee Class A Miss Basketball. Katie came to UT-Chattanooga  after finishing high school in 2000. She became an integral member of four straight Southern Conference Championship teams. During her playing tenure at UTC, the Mocs posted an overall record of 102–23 with victories over Florida State, Louisville and Alabama.

Coaching career
After graduating from UTC, Burrows became an  assistant girls basketball coach at GPS under former UTC player Susan Lance Crownover .In 2005, she took the position as  a head coach in Tullahoma, Tennessee for the girls' basketball team at Tullahoma High School. She also taught both physical and health education at Tullahoma High. She spent 8 seasons with Wes Moore and then five seasons with Women's Basketball Hall of Fame head coach Jim Foster as an assistant at Chattanooga. In 2018, Katie Burrows became the 6th head coach in the history of Mocs women's basketball.

Personal life
Katie received her Bachelors of Science in Exercise Science and Health K-12. She later married Nick Burrows They have two daughters, Jordan and Grace.

Head coaching record

NCAA D1

References

1982 births
Living people
Sportspeople from Chattanooga, Tennessee
Basketball coaches from Tennessee
Basketball players from Tennessee
Chattanooga Mocs women's basketball coaches
Chattanooga Mocs women's basketball players